Better Off Dead is the fourth studio album by German thrash metal band Sodom, released on 1 October 1990 by Steamhammer/SPV. The song "The Saw Is the Law" in an altered version that was released on the EP The Saw Is the Law.

Track listing

Trivia
 "Resurrection" is dedicated to Angelripper's late father
 The spoken passages at the beginning of "An Eye for an Eye" is taken from the 1989 film The Punisher.

Personnel
Sodom
 Tom Angelripper  - vocals, bass
 Michael Hoffmann - guitars
 Chris Witchhunter - drums

Production
Andreas Marschall - cover art
Harris Johns - production, mixing

References

1990 albums
Sodom (band) albums
SPV/Steamhammer albums
Albums produced by Harris Johns